Walkerana leptodactyla is a species of frog endemic to the southern Western Ghats in Kerala and Tamil Nadu states of southern India. Precise reports are from Anaimalai hills, Palni hills, Meghamalai, Travancore hills and Agasthyamalai. It is a terrestrial to semi-aquatic frog associated with the leaf-litter of high-elevation evergreen montane forest; it is not known from modified habitats. It is uncommon and believed to be declining in abundance.

Description
Vomerine teeth in two oblique groups just behind the level of the choanae. A free, pointed papilla on the middle of the tongue. Head moderate, rather depressed; snout blunt, with moderate canthus rostralis; interorbital space as broad as, or a little narrower than, the upper eyelid; tympanum distinct, half the diameter of the eye. lingers moderate, first not extending as far as second; toes one-third or one-fourth webbed; tips of fingers and toes dilated into small but well-developed disks; subarticular tubercles well developed; a small, oval, inner metatarsal tubercle; no tarsal fold. Tibio-tarsal articulation reaching the tip of the snout or beyond. Skin of the back with short longitudinal glandular folds; a fold from the eye to the shoulder. Olive or brownish above, mottled with darker; a more or less distinct subtriangular dark spot between the eyes, often limited in front by a light cross band; sometimes a light vertebral band; a black band along the canthus rostralis, and a black temporal spot; limbs cross-barred; beneath, immaculate or spotted with brown, sometimes brown dotted with white.
From snout to vent 1.3 inches.

References

leptodactyla
Endemic fauna of the Western Ghats
Frogs of India
Amphibians described in 1882
Taxobox binomials not recognized by IUCN